Juliano Moro (born 13 September 1977) is a Brazilian racing driver. He has raced in such series as Euro Formula 3000 and Stock Car Brasil. He won the Formula Three Sudamericana series in 2001, Fórmula Ford and other Endurance championships.

Racing record

Career summary

Complete Euro Formula 3000 results
(key) (Races in bold indicate pole position; races in italics indicate fastest lap)

References

External links

1977 births
Living people
Stock Car Brasil drivers
People from Tocantins
Brazilian racing drivers
Sportspeople from Porto Alegre

ISR Racing drivers
Charouz Racing System drivers